Maeda Toshiyasu may refer to:

Maeda Toshiyasu (Daishoji) (1779–1806), daimyō of Daishoji Domain
Maeda Toshiyasu (Toyama) (1800–1859), naturalist, entomologist and daimyō of Toyama Domain

See also
Maeda clan